Jeffrey Alan Knuth (born 9 March 1962) is an Australian politician.

Biography
Born in Ayr, Queensland, he was a painter and decorator before entering politics. In 1998, he was elected to the Legislative Assembly of Queensland as a member of Pauline Hanson's One Nation, representing the seat of Burdekin. He was party whip and spokesperson for Public Works and Housing until 23 February 1999, when he resigned from the party to sit as an independent. On 5 August, he formed the Country Party Queensland (initially known as New Country Party QLD) as a splinter group from One Nation, but on 18 February 2000 joined the larger City Country Alliance, led by Bill Feldman. He was defeated by Labor's Steve Rodgers in 2001, and contested the seat in the 2004 state election as an independent with the support of federal independent MP Bob Katter. While he lost, his preferences were enough to help the Nationals' Rosemary Menkens defeat Rodgers. He later became aligned with the national New Country Party.

His brother, Shane Knuth, won the seat of Charters Towers for the National Party and later joined Katter's Australian Party with Jeff.

He rejoined One Nation in 2014. The following year, he contested the 2015 state election in the seat of Thuringowa as a One Nation candidate. He was unsuccessful in winning the seat, polling fourth with 7.4% of the vote.

References

1962 births
Living people
One Nation members of the Parliament of Queensland
Independent members of the Parliament of Queensland
Members of the Queensland Legislative Assembly
House painters
21st-century Australian politicians